Gustav Adolf Semler (14 March 1885 – 24 February 1968) was a German stage and film actor of the silent era. He appeared in 41 films between 1918 and 1929.

Selected filmography

 Alraune, die Henkerstochter, genannt die rote Hanne (1918)
 Lola Montez (1919)
 The Duty to Live (1919)
 Colombine (1920)
 The Yellow Death (1920)
 The Haunting of Castle Kitay (1920)
 The Black Count (1920)
 Love and Passion (1921)
 Gloria Fatalis (1922)
 Mignon (1922)
 The Violin King (1923)
 The Other Woman (1924)
 People in Need (1925)
 The Violet Eater (1926)
 The Good Reputation (1926)
 Watch on the Rhine (1926)
 The Eleven Schill Officers (1926)
  Eva and the Grasshopper (1927)

References

External links

1885 births
1968 deaths
German male stage actors
German male film actors
German male silent film actors
20th-century German male actors
People from Celle